Conichalcite, CaCu(AsO4)(OH), is a relatively common arsenate mineral related to duftite (PbCu(AsO4)(OH)). It is green, often botryoidal, and occurs in the oxidation zone of some metal deposits. It occurs with limonite, malachite, beudantite, adamite, cuproadamite, olivenite and smithsonite.

Formation 

Conichalcite forms in the oxidation zones of copper orebodies.  Here groundwater enriched with oxygen reacts with copper sulfide and copper oxide to produce an array of minerals such as malachite, azurite and linarite.  Conichalcite is often found encrusted on to limonitic rocks that have yellow to red colors. 

Conichalcite will also form a solid solution series with the mineral calciovolborthite. When these two minerals form a solid solution series, the two interchanging elements are arsenic and vanadium. Conichalcite is the arsenic rich end member of the series and calciovolborthite is the vanadium rich end member.

Notable occurrences of conichalcite include Juab Co., Utah; Lincoln and Lyon counties of Nevada and Bisbee, Arizona, in the US; Durango, Mexico; Collahuasi, Tarapaca, Chile; Calstock, Cornwall and Caldbeck Fells, Cumbria, England; Andalusia, Spain; and Tsumeb, Namibia.

References

Arsenate minerals
Orthorhombic minerals
Minerals in space group 19